Tebo Creek is a stream in Benton and Henry Counties in the U.S. state of Missouri.

The stream flows generally south and southeast to enter the waters of Truman Reservoir east of Clinton.

The name Tebo is a corruption of the French surnames Taveau or Thibeault.

Variant names include: Big Tebo Creek, Tabo Creek, Teabeau Creek, Teabo Creek and Thibault River.

See also
List of rivers of Missouri

References

Rivers of Benton County, Missouri
Rivers of Henry County, Missouri
Rivers of Missouri